Hekla Stålstrenga is a Norwegian folk and folk rock band specializing in North Norwegian traditional music. It was formed in 2008 as a duo by fiddler Ragnhild Furebotten and guitarist Tore Bruvoll. They had their first recording as a duo, for which they were nominated during Spellemannprisen, the Norwegian Grammies, for "Best folk music band". They later on added lead vocalist Anne Nymo Trulsen, drummer Ole-Jakob Larsen and acoustic bassist Trond-Viggo Solas to become a five-member band.

The band was nominated for another Spellemannprisen in 2011 after release of their album Makramé. The album charted in VG-lista, the official Norwegian Albums Chart. It was released on the local Ta:lik label to which the band is signed to. Makramé is a word deriving from Arabic meaning the art of tying strings to use or decorative purposes.

Besides their collaborations, various artists in the band are developing their own solo careers. Lead vocalist Anne Nymo Trulsen released her own debut album Skråblikk in 2013.

Band members 
Anne Nymo Trulsen - lead vocals
Ragnhild Furebotten - fiddle
Tore Bruvoll - guitar
Trond-Viggo Solas - bass
Ole-Jakob Larsen - drums

Honors 
In 2008, as the duo Hekla Stålstrenga, the duo members Ragnhild Furebotten and Tore Bruvoll were nominated for "Best Folk music/gammaldans" category for their work during the Spellemannprisen, the Norwegian Grammies.
In 2011, they were nominated for "Best Folk music / traditional music" category during Spellemannprisen.

Discography

Albums

Singles 
"Folketonen" 2012
"Båtbygger Jo" 2013

References

External links 
Hekla Stålstrenga on Myspace
Folk: Reinhekla magi - April 24, 2013 NRK (in Norwegian)

Norwegian musical groups